Jon Madof  (born May 28, 1974) is an American guitarist, composer, and leader of the bands Rashanim and Zion80, who has performed extensively with other artists including John Zorn, Matisyahu, Marc Ribot, and Frank London.

PopMatters' Sean Murphy said "All of his projects thus far have explored traditional Jewish sounds with a skillful blend of surf music, thrash, jazz and calmer acoustic. Each successive effort has seen Madof stretching and pushing himself farther, in as well as out, utilizing exotic instruments with feeling always at the forefront".

Discography

As leader
With Rashanim
Rashanim (Tzadik, 2003)
Masada Rock (Tzadik, 2005) - composed by John Zorn
Shalosh (Tzadik, 2006)
The Gathering (Tzadik, 2009)

With Zion80
Zion80 (Tzadik, 2012)
Adramelech: Book of Angels Volume 22 (Tzadik, 2014) - composed by John Zorn
 Warriors (Chant Records, 2017)

With others
With Sean Noonan's Brewed by Noon
Stories to Tell (Songlines, 2007)
With John Zorn
Voices in the Wilderness (Tzadik, 2003) - one track with Rashanim
The Unknown Masada (Tzadik, 2003) - one track with Rashanim
Filmworks XVII: Notes on Marie Menken/Ray Bandar: A Life with Skulls (Tzadik, 2006)
Various Artists
Great Jewish Music: Jacob Do Bandolim (Tzadik, 2004) - one track with Rashanim

References

1974 births
Living people
Place of birth missing (living people)
American male guitarists
21st-century American guitarists
21st-century American male musicians
American male jazz musicians